The puff-backed bulbul (Euptilotus eutilotus) is a species of songbird in the family Pycnonotidae. It is the only species placed in the genus Euptilotus. It is found on the Malay Peninsula, Sumatra and Borneo. Alternate names for the puff-backed bulbul include the crested brown bulbul and puff-backed brown bulbul.
Its natural habitat is subtropical or tropical moist lowland forests.
It is threatened by habitat loss.

References

puff-backed bulbul
Birds of Malesia
puff-backed bulbul
Taxonomy articles created by Polbot